List of ambassadors of Iceland may refer to:

Ambassadors of Iceland
Ambassador of Iceland to Austria
Ambassador of Iceland to Belgium
Ambassador of Iceland to Canada
Ambassador of Iceland to China
Ambassador of Iceland to Czechoslovakia
Ambassador of Iceland to Denmark
Ambassador of Iceland to East Germany
Ambassador of Iceland to Finland
Ambassador of Iceland to France
Ambassador of Iceland to Germany
Ambassador of Iceland to India
Ambassador of Iceland to Japan
Ambassador of Iceland to Norway
Ambassador of Iceland to Peru
Ambassador of Iceland to Russia
Ambassador of Iceland to Saudi Arabia
Ambassador of Iceland to Serbia and Montenegro
Ambassador of Iceland to Sweden
Ambassador of Iceland to the Soviet Union
Ambassador of Iceland to the United Kingdom
Ambassador of Iceland to the United States
Ambassador of Iceland to Tunisia
Ambassador of Iceland to Turkey
Ambassador of Iceland to Venezuela
Ambassador of Iceland to Yugoslavia

Lists of ambassadors by country of origin